Sogatani Dam is an earthfill dam located in Fukui Prefecture in Japan. The dam is used for irrigation. The catchment area of the dam is 1 km2. The dam impounds about 3  ha of land when full and can store 230 thousand cubic meters of water. The construction of the dam was started on 1975 and completed in 1980.

References

Dams in Fukui Prefecture
1980 establishments in Japan